Karl Dickey "Koley" Kolseth (December 25, 1892 – May 3, 1956) was a Major League Baseball first baseman who played for the Baltimore Terrapins of the Federal League in .

He began his professional career with the Lawrence Barristers of the class B New England League in 1911. After his single season in the major leagues, he returned to minor league baseball with the Chambersburg Maroons of the class D Blue Ridge League in 1916. His last minor league season was with the Easton Farmers of the Eastern Shore League in 1926. Overall, he had a .292 batting average in the minors, with his single best season batting average being .333 with Hanover and Waynesboro of the Blue Ridge League in 1920.

External links

1892 births
1956 deaths
Major League Baseball first basemen
Baltimore Terrapins players
Baseball players from Massachusetts
Sportspeople from Cambridge, Massachusetts
Minor league baseball managers
Lawrence Barristers players
Chambersburg Maroons players
Newark Bears (IL) players
Rochester Hustlers players
Portsmouth Truckers players
Waynesboro Red Birds players
Hanover Raiders players
Charlotte Hornets (baseball) players
Spartanburg Pioneers players
Spartanburg Spartans players
York White Roses players
Cambridge Canners players
Frederick Hustlers players
Easton Farmers players